AW Sindhu Vidya Bhavan is a high school in Pune, Maharashtra, India.

The school has received the International School Award (ISA) by the British Council in 2009 and several other awards in art exhibitions.

See also 
List of schools in Pune

References 

High schools and secondary schools in Maharashtra
Schools in Pune
1974 establishments in Maharashtra
Educational institutions established in 1974
Private schools in Maharashtra